Andrew Mitchell is a British Conservative politician.

Andrew Mitchell may also refer to:

Noblemen and public officials
Sir Andrew Mitchell, 2nd Baronet (c. 1706–1764), of the Mitchell baronets
Andrew Mitchell (diplomat) (1708–1771), British diplomat
Andy Mitchell (politician) (born 1953), Canadian political figure; Liberal from Ontario; MP for Parry Sound-Muskoka from 1993 to 2006
Andrew Jonathan Mitchell, former British Ambassador to Sweden

Sports
Andrew Mitchell (American football) (born 1985), American tackle for the Cincinnati Bengals
Andrew Mitchell (footballer, born 1879), Scottish footballer who played for Albion Rovers and Woolwich Arsenal in late 1890s
Andrew Mitchell (footballer, born 1992), Northern Irish footballer who plays for Linfield
Andrew Mitchell (full-back) (fl. 1892–1894), Scottish footballer; played for Airdrieonians, Newton Heath and Burton Swifts in 1890s
Andrew Mitchell (hurler) (born 1980), Irish hurler
Andrew Mitchell (umpire), Australian rules football umpire
Andy Mitchell (footballer, born 1907) (1907–1971), English football player for Darlington and Manchester United
Andy Mitchell (footballer, born 1976), English football player for Chesterfield
Andy Mitchell (footballer, born 1990), English football player for Chester City
Drew Mitchell (born 1984), Australian rugby union player

Other
Andrew Mitchell (Royal Navy officer) (1757–1806), Scottish admiral
Andrew Ronald Mitchell (1921–2007), British applied mathematician and numerical analyst
Andy Mitchell, lead vocalist with the reformed The Yardbirds
Andy Mitchell, character in The Pendragon Adventure series by D. J. MacHale

See also
Mitchell (disambiguation)#People